Since ascending to the thrones of the Commonwealth realms in 2022, King Charles III has been responsible for receiving state and official visits.

List of visits

Countries who have made state visits

See also 
List of official overseas trips made by Charles III

Sources 

Personal timelines
Lists of diplomatic visits by heads of state
Diplomatic visits to the United Kingdom
Charles III
Charles III
Charles III